The 2009–10 season of Argentine football was the 119th season of competitive football in Argentina.

National leagues

Men's

Primera División

Apertura champion: Banfield (1st title).
Top scorer:  Santiago Silva (14 goals).
Clausura champion: Argentinos Juniors (3rd title).
Top scorer:  Mauro Boselli (13 goals).
International qualifiers:
2010 Copa Libertadores:  Banfield, Colón, Lanús, Newell's Old Boys.
2011 Copa Libertadores:  Argentinos Juniors.
2010 Copa Sudamericana:  Banfield, Argentinos Juniors, Estudiantes de La Plata, Newell's Old Boys, Independiente, Vélez Sársfield.
Relegated: Chacarita Juniors, Atlético Tucumán, Rosario Central.
Source: RSSSF

Primera B Nacional
Champion: Olimpo (4th title).
Top scorer: Leandro Armani (19 goals).
Promoted: Olimpo, Quilmes, All Boys.
Relegated: Sportivo Italiano, Platense.
Source: RSSSF

Primera B Metropolitana
Champion: Almirante Brown (2nd title).
Top scorer: Luciano Lo Bianco  (19 goals).
Promoted: Almirante Brown.
Relegated: Central Córdoba.
Source: RSSSF

Torneo Argentino A
Champion: Patronato (1st title).
Top scorer: Diego Jara (26 goals).
Promoted: Patronato.
Relegated: Ben Hur, Atlético Juventud.
Source: RSSSF

Primera C Metropolitana
Champion: Barracas Central (2nd title).
Top scorer: Carlos Salom (18 goals).
Promoted: Barracas Central.
Relegated: Argentino de Rosario.
Source: RSSSF

Torneo Argentino B
Promoted: Douglas Haig, Central Norte.
Relegated: Argentino de Mendoza, La Florida, Luján de Cuyo, Defensores de Salto, Real Arroyo Seco.
Source: RSSSF

Primera D Metropolitana
Champion: UAI Urquiza (1st title).
Top scorer: Mariano Panno (24 goals).
Promoted: UAI Urquiza, Liniers.
Relegated: Muñiz.
Source: RSSSF

Torneo Argentino C
Promoted: Complejo Teniente Origone, Sarmiento (LB), Argentino (VdM), Atlético Paraná, Altos Hornos Zapla.
Source: RSSSF

Women's

Campeonato de Fútbol Femenino
Apertura champion: Boca Juniors (17th title).
Clausura champion: River Plate (10th title).
International qualifier:
2010 Copa Libertadores de Fútbol Femenino: Boca Juniors.
Source: RSSSF

Clubs in international competitions

Men's

Women's

National teams

Men's
This section covers Argentina men's matches from August 1, 2009 to July 31, 2010.

Friendly matches

2010 World Cup qualifiers

2010 World Cup

Women's
This section covers Argentina women's matches from August 1, 2009 to July 31, 2010.

Friendly matches

Copa Bicentenario

References

External links
AFA
Argentina on FIFA.com

 
Seasons in Argentine football